Marcelino da Mata (7 May 1940 – 11 February 2021) was a Portuguese Army officer, born in Portuguese Guinea.

Early life and education
Marcelino da Mata was born in Ponte Nova, Portuguese Guinea and studied until completing the entire secondary education in Portuguese Guinea. When his older brother was conscripted into the military service he took his place. This began Marcelino da Mata's military career.

Military career
In the army, he distinguished himself as a polyglot with understanding of many local and regional languages and dialects. His linguistic skills were useful and in high demand for the army. He served in Portuguese Guinea. His experience would cause him to enroll in special operations training courses, eventually graduating as a commando. In the following years, Marcelino da Mata would become distinguished for numerous acts of valor during the Portuguese Colonial War. Having participated in 2,412 operations, he is the most decorated Portuguese military officer in the history of the Portuguese Army. Demobilized by the departing Portuguese military authorities after the Carnation Revolution of 1974 in Lisbon and the independence of Portuguese Guinea, a total of 7,447 black Guinea-Bissauan African soldiers who had served in Portuguese native commando forces and militia were summarily executed by the PAIGC after the independence of the new African country. He managed to avoid the same fate of other Portuguese African soldiers in Guinea-Bissau as he was in mainland Portugal undergoing convalescence due to a wound caused by a firearm accidentally shot by another Portuguese soldier shortly after the Carnation Revolution (which effectively ended the war) has taken place in Greater Lisbon, where he would live the rest of his entire life. He was subjected to torture by elements of the Portuguese far-left in 1975 during a tumultuous revolutionary period called Processo Revolucionário em Curso (PREC).

Death
He died from COVID-19 related complications at the Professor Doutor Fernando Fonseca Hospital (also known as Amadora-Sintra Hospital) in Amadora, Portugal, on February 11, 2021, at age 80, during the COVID-19 pandemic in Portugal.

References 

Portuguese military officers
1940 births
2021 deaths
Deaths from the COVID-19 pandemic in Portugal
Portuguese people of Bissau-Guinean descent
People from Amadora
Recipients of the Order of the Tower and Sword